Yvon Landry Mvogo Nganoma (born 6 June 1994) is a professional footballer who plays as a goalkeeper for  club Lorient. Born in Cameroon, he plays for the Switzerland national team.

Club career
Mvogo was born in Yaoundé, Cameroon.  He made his professional debut at 17 August 2013 in the Swiss Cup against Veyrier. He played the full game in a 0-8 away win. He wears kit number 18. His contract expires in June 2018.

In April 2017, it was revealed that Mvogo will be joining Bundesliga and future UEFA Champions League debutants Leipzig on 1 July 2017, after signing a four-year deal with the Saxony-based club.

On 25 August 2020, Mvogo signed for PSV on a two-year loan.

On 13 July 2022, Mvogo signed a two-year contract with Lorient in France.

International career
Mvogo got his first call up to the senior Switzerland squad for a UEFA Euro 2016 qualifier against Lithuania in June 2015. He was included in the Switzerland national football team 23-man squad for the 2018 FIFA World Cup. He made his first appearance for the national team on 15 October 2018 against Iceland for a 2018–19 UEFA Nations League group match. In May 2019, he was named to the national team for the 2019 UEFA Nations League Finals, but did not play in either of Switzerland's matches as his side finished fourth. In 2021 he was called up to the national team for the  2020 UEFA European Championship, where the team created one of the main sensations of the tournament reaching the quarter-finals.

Career statistics

Club

Honours
PSV
KNVB Cup: 2021–22
Johan Cruyff Shield: 2021

References

1994 births
Living people
Footballers from Yaoundé
Swiss men's footballers
Switzerland youth international footballers
Switzerland under-21 international footballers
Switzerland international footballers
Association football goalkeepers
BSC Young Boys players
RB Leipzig players
PSV Eindhoven players
FC Lorient players
Swiss Super League players
Bundesliga players
Eredivisie players
2018 FIFA World Cup players
UEFA Euro 2020 players
Swiss expatriate footballers
Swiss expatriate sportspeople in Germany
Expatriate footballers in Germany
Swiss expatriate sportspeople in the Netherlands
Expatriate footballers in the Netherlands
Swiss expatriate sportspeople in France
Expatriate footballers in France
Swiss people of Cameroonian descent
Swiss sportspeople of African descent